The cabinet of Constantin Coandă was the government of Romania from 24 October to 28 November 1918. This period was the closing days of World War I.

Ministers
The ministers of the cabinet were as follows:

President of the Council of Ministers:
Gen. Constantin Coandă (24 October - 28 November 1918)
Minister of the Interior: 
Gen. Artur Văitoianu (24 October - 28 November 1918)
Minister of Foreign Affairs: 
Gen. Constantin Coandă (24 October - 28 November 1918)
Minister of Finance:
(interim) Fotin Enescu (24 - 29 October 1918)
Oscar Kiriacescu (29 October - 28 November 1918)
Minister of Justice:
(interim) Gen. Artur Văitoianu (24 - 28 October 1918)
Dumitru Buzdugan (28 October - 28 November 1918)
Minister of Religious Affairs and Public Instruction:
Petru Poni (24 October - 28 November 1918)
Minister of War:
Gen. Eremia Grigorescu (24 October - 28 November 1918)
Minister of Public Works:
Anghel Saligny (24 October - 28 November 1918)
Minister of Industry and Commerce:
(interim) Gen. Eremia Grigorescu (24 - 29 October 1918)
Alexandru Cottescu (29 October - 28 November 1918)
Minister of Agriculture and Property:
Fotin Enescu (24 October - 28 November 1918)

Ministers without portfolio (for Bessarabia):
Ion Inculeț (24 October - 28 November 1918)
Daniel Ciugureanu (24 October - 28 November 1918)

References

Cabinets of Romania
Cabinets established in 1918
Cabinets disestablished in 1918
1918 establishments in Romania
1918 disestablishments in Romania
Romania in World War I